Since the arrival of the first motor cars on the island in 1907, Cyprus has developed a modern road network. According to 2002 statistics, the road network in the Republic of Cyprus-administered areas of Cyprus consists of about 7,206 km of paved and 4,387 km of unpaved roads. Although the first motorway in Cyprus, A1, was completed as recently as October 1985, the country already has the most motorway km per capita (36.8 km /100,000 inhabitants) among all European Union members.
There are no toll paying roads in Cyprus to date.

Maintenance

The Public Works Department of the Ministry of Communications and Works is responsible for the maintenance, improvement and construction of motorways, the majority of rural and interurban road network and the main urban roads.  The Municipalities are responsible for the secondary and local urban roads; the District Administration Authorities are responsible for the paved and unpaved district (tertiary) roads and village roads.  The Forestry Department is responsible for most unpaved roads in forest areas, this is in order to accommodate the administration and protection of forests.

The Turkish invasion of 1974 radically changed the program of road development and created new priorities in order to cover the augmented needs in the government controlled areas, where 80% of the Cyprus population and the greatest portion of development had concentrated.

Under these circumstances New Road Development Schemes were promoted, which were partially financed by foreign Financing Organizations.  Under these development projects new 4 lane motorways were constructed and more are on their way as follows:

Cyprus motorways list

The highway network is continuously developed. The first section of the A9 Nicosia - Astromeritis Motorway between Kokkinotrimithia and Akaki has been completed, whereas the rest is under study.  Also the upgrading of the Limassol Junctions and the A1 Nicosia - Limassol Motorway to a 6 lane road between the Strovolos Junction and Alampra Interchange are completed.

The following are under design:

A7 Paphos - Polis Motorway is promoted through the D.B.F.O. method (Design, Build, Finance, Operate).

Preliminary and feasibility studies are conducted for the:

 Nicosia Ring road
 A8 Limassol - Saittas Motorway
Astromeritis - Evrychou Motorway
 Nicosia - Klirou Motorway

Road network categories and numbering

Roads and Motorways in Cyprus can be classified into 5 main categories:

  Motorways, 2 lanes per direction, free of any at-grade intersections. They are the most important road network on the island, and the letter "A" is used on their official numbering system. Motorways usually run parallel to the same-number "B class" intercity roads that they replaced and sometimes these roads are even transformed to Motorways (e.g. A3 Motorway and B3 road). While there is no formal announcement about the numbering of new motorways under construction and under planning, it's anticipated that they will have the same number as their current main road. So Limassol - Saittas Motorway will be coded A8 because A is the letter of Motorways and 8 because it will "replace" B8 road.
Main Roads, Intercity roads, mostly one lane per direction, except sometimes in residential areas up to two lanes. B is the letter used in their official numbering system, with a number up to two digits long. Most of them have been replaced with their same-number  Motorway (e.g. Traffic from Nicosia to Limassol now uses the A1 Motorway while in the past B1 road was the main connection between these cities)."B type" roads can be also main avenues within the city limits.
 Roads, secondary road network, mostly connecting rural areas. One lane per direction, always paved. They use the letter "E" in their formal numbering system and they are 3 digits long. First digit is the serial number of the main road that the secondary road begins from (or the secondary road, that begins at another secondary road which begins at a main road etc.) and the last two digits is the serial number of the road. Smaller digits where the main road begins, larger ones near main road's ending.
 Local roads, when coded during the 80's one lane and often dirt roads, today almost completely paved, and waiting for letter re - evaluation. They use "F" in the official coding system, and they are counted in the same way as "E"s are. There is no "E" with the same number as an "F".
 Unclassified roads. They can be "B" and "E" type. The case here is that these roads were constructed after the road network was numbered, so they will remain without a serial number and road signs will remain with gaps until the next road numbering evaluation.

Road safety
Cyprus currently holds a worse than average road safety record in the  European Union

 Pre-2008 data: European Commission Road Safety Country Profile report for Cyprus. Post-2008 data:  Cyprus' National Open Data Portal

 Data entered from 2008 onwards does not include deaths or fatalities.

References

Part of this article was copied from Cyprus's Press and Information office multimedia software "Aspects of Cyprus".

Transport in Cyprus

Roads in Cyprus